Motherless Brooklyn is a novel by Jonathan Lethem that was first published in 1999. The story is set in Brooklyn, and follows Lionel Essrog, a detective who has Tourette's, a disorder marked by involuntary tics. Essrog works for Frank Minna, a small-time neighborhood owner of a "seedy and makeshift" detective agency. Together, Essrog and three other characters—Tony, Danny, and Gilbert—call themselves "the Minna Men".

Critical reception 
The novel won the 1999 National Book Critics Circle Award for fiction and the 2000 Gold Dagger award for crime fiction.

Albert Mobilio of The New York Times wrote:

Under the guise of a detective novel, Lethem has written a more piercing tale of investigation, one revealing how the mind drives on its own "wheels within wheels." Unlike the stock detective novel it shadows, the thriller in which clarity emerges on the final page, Motherless Brooklyn immerses us in the mind's dense thicket, a place where words split and twine in an ever-deepening tangle.

Gary Krist of Salon wrote:
Motherless Brooklyn has a few problems—including some cartoon-like stock characters and one scene near the end that flirts with maudlin sentimentality—but it works far better than the average hip postmodern novel in terms of sheer emotional impact. Because Lethem never lets the metaphorical and linguistic possibilities of his narrator's illness overshadow his immensely appealing humanity, we really care about Lionel and his search for his mentor's killer.

Film adaptation

Actor and filmmaker Edward Norton acquired the film rights almost immediately after the book was published, but production started only in February 2018. Norton wrote, produced, directed, and starred together with Willem Dafoe, Bruce Willis, Gugu Mbatha-Raw, and Alec Baldwin. The film differs significantly from the book. Regarding the transposition of the story from the book's contemporary time to the fifties, and Lethem's very literal interpretation of neo-noir characters, Lethem said that "the alchemical quality of the written word makes it okay. But if you start photographing that, it's going to look like Halloween, like they're dressing up".

The film had its world premiere at the Telluride Film Festival on 30 August 2019. It was not successful at the box office, with Slate's Marissa Martinelli summarizing that "Norton's film often feels less like an adaptation and more like a work of fan fiction 20 years in the making, with Norton borrowing Lethem's protagonist and the broad strokes of his plot to create something almost entirely new".

References

External links
 Motherless Brooklyn by Jonathan Lethem, reviewed by Ted Gioia (Postmodern Mystery)

1999 American novels
Novels by Jonathan Lethem
American detective novels
Works about Tourette syndrome
Novels set in Brooklyn
Doubleday (publisher) books
American novels adapted into films
Postmodern novels